Lofenalac (pronunciation:Lo-fen-alac) is a registered, trademarked infant powder formula prescribed to replace milk in the diets of phenylketonuria sufferers in the infant and child stage. It is not recommended for non-PKU patients. In 1972, Lofenalac was declared a food by the FDA, for regulatory purposes.

Initially the only available formula recommended was made by Mead Johnson. Others, including Albumaid XP, Cymogran, and Minafen, have since been developed in Britain. Medical texts often recommend Lofenalac.

Lofenalac can be rather expensive to purchase and few retailers stock it. The taste and smell has been described by adult users as "medical" and offensive, although infants do not mind the flavor and children often consume it without complaint for some years.

See also 
 Kuvan (trade name for the cofactor tetrahydrobiopterin in a pill form)
 Diet therapy

References

Resources

External links 
 

Infant feeding
Milk substitutes
Patented foods